Gail Davenport (born March 1, 1949) is an American politician who has served in the Georgia State Senate from the 44th district since 2011. She previously served in the Georgia State Senate from 2007 to 2009.

References

External links
 Profile at the Georgia State Senate
 Campaign website

1949 births
Living people
Democratic Party Georgia (U.S. state) state senators
21st-century American politicians
21st-century American women politicians
Women state legislators in Georgia (U.S. state)